Moses Levy (1757 Philadelphia, PennsylvaniaMay 9, 1826 Philadelphia, Pennsylvania) was a prominent Jew in Colonial America.

Biography  
Moses Levy was born in 1757 in Philadelphia. His father, Samson Levy, was a signatory of the celebrated resolutions not to import goods from England until the Stamp act had been repealed. Moses was educated at the University of Pennsylvania, from which he graduated in 1772. On March 19, 1778, he was admitted to the bar; from 1802 to 1822 he was recorder of Philadelphia; and from 1822 to 1825, presiding judge of the district court for the city and county of Philadelphia. At one time he was a member of the Pennsylvania legislature, and he was a trustee of the University of Pennsylvania for twenty-four years. Levy died on May 9, 1826 in  Philadelphia.

See also
History of the Jews in Colonial America
List of first minority male lawyers and judges in Pennsylvania

References

1757 births
1826 deaths
Lawyers from Philadelphia
American Sephardic Jews
Jewish American state legislators in Pennsylvania
University of Pennsylvania alumni
People of colonial Pennsylvania
19th-century American lawyers